Daucus maritimus may refer to three different taxa of plants:
 Daucus maritimus With., a synonym for Daucus carota subsp. carota L.
 Daucus maritimus Lam., a synonym for Daucus carota subsp. maritimus (Lam.) Batt.
 Daucus maritimus (L.) Gaertn., a synonym for Daucus pumilus (L.) Hoffmanns. & Link